The national flag of South Korea, also known as the Taegukgi (also spelled as Taegeukgi) and colloquially known as the flag of Korea, has three parts: a white rectangular background, a red and blue Taegeuk in its center, accompanied by four black trigrams, one in each corner. Flags similar to the current Taegeukgi were used as the national flag of Korea by the Joseon dynasty, the Korean Empire, as well as the Korean government-in-exile during Japanese rule. South Korea adopted the Taegukgi as its national flag when it gained independence from Japan on 15 August 1945.

Symbolism
The flag's field is white, a traditional color in Korean culture that was common in the daily attire of 19th-century Koreans and still appears in contemporary versions of traditional Korean garments such as the hanbok. The color represents peace and purity.

The circle in the flag's center symbolizes balance in the world. The blue half represents the sky, and the red half represents the land.

Together, the trigrams represent movement and harmony as fundamental principles. Each trigram (hangeul:  [gwae];) represents one of the four classical elements, as described below:

History

Background
In 1876, the absence of a national flag became an issue for Korea, at the time reigned over by the Joseon dynasty. Before 1876, Korea did not have a national flag, but the king had his own royal standard. The lack of a national flag became a quandary during negotiations for the Japan–Korea Treaty of 1876, at which the delegate of Japan displayed the Japanese national flag, whereas the Joseon dynasty had no corresponding national symbol to exhibit. At that time, some proposed to create a national flag, but the Joseon government looked upon the matter as unimportant and unnecessary. By 1880, the proliferation of foreign negotiations led to the need for a national flag. The most popular proposal was described in the "Korea Strategy" papers, written by the Chinese delegate Huang Zunxian. It proffered to incorporate the flag of the Qing dynasty of China into that of the Joseon dynasty of Korea. In response to the Chinese proposal, the Joseon government dispatched delegate Lee Young-Sook to consider the scheme with Chinese statesman and diplomat Li Hongzhang. Li agreed with some elements of Huang's suggestion while accepting that Korea would make some alterations. The Qing government assented to Li's conclusions, but the degree of enthusiasm with which the Joseon government explored this proposal is unknown.

The issue remained unpursued for a period but reemerged with the negotiation of the United States–Korea Treaty of 1882, also known as the Shufeldt Treaty. The US emissary Robert Wilson Shufeldt suggested that Korea adopt a national flag to represent its sovereignty. The king of Joseon, Kojong, ordered government officials Sin Heon and Kim Hong-jip to begin working on a new flag. Kim Hong-jip in turn asked delegate Lee Eung-jun to create the first design, which Lee Eung-jun presented to the Chinese official Ma Jianzhong. Ma Jianzhong argued against Huang Zunxian's proposal that Korea adopt the flag of the Qing dynasty, and proposed a modified dragon flag. Kojong rejected this idea. Ma suggested Lee Eung-jun's Taegeuk and Eight Trigrams flag. Kim and Ma proposed changes to it: Kim proposed changing the red to blue and white; Ma proposed a white field, a red and black Taegeuk, black Eight Trigrams, and a red border. On 14 may 1882, before the Joseon–United States Treaty of 1882, Park Yeong-hyo presented a scale model of the Lee Eung-jun's Taegukgi to the Joseon government. And Gojong approved Lee Eung-jun's taegukgi. Park Yeong-hyo became the first person to use the Taegukgi in 1882. The 2 October 1882 issue of the Japanese newspaper Jiji shimpō credited Gojong as the designer of the Taegukgi (i.e., a flag with a red and blue Taegeuk and four trigrams). On 27 January 1883, the Joseon government officially promulgated the Taegukgi to be used as the official national flag.

In 1919, a flag similar to the current South Korean flag was used by the provisional Korean government-in-exile based in China.

After the restoration of Korean independence in 1945, the Taegukgi remained in use after the southern portion of Korea became a republic under the influence of the United States but also used by the People's Republic of Korea. At the same time, the flag of the United States was also used by the United States Army Military Government in Korea along with the Taegukgi. Following the establishment of the South Korean state in August 1948, the current flag was declared official by the government of South Korea on 15 October 1949, although it had been used as the de facto national flag before then.

In February 1984, the exact dimensional specifications of the flag were codified. In October 1997, the precise color scheme of the flag was fixed via presidential decree for the first time.

Cultural role in contemporary South Korean society
The name of the South Korean flag is used in the title of a 2004 film about the Korean War, Tae Guk Gi.

Observers such as The Times Literary Supplements Colin Marshall and Korea scholar Brian Reynolds Myers have noted that the South Korean flag in the context of the country's society is often used as an ethnic flag, representing a grander nationalistic idea of a racialized (Korean) people rather than merely symbolizing the (South Korean) state itself as national flags do in other countries. Myers argues that: "When the average [South Korean] man sees the [South Korean] flag, he feels fraternity with [ethnic] Koreans around the world." Myers also stated in a 2011 thesis that: "Judging from the yin-yang flag's universal popularity in South Korea, even among those who deny the legitimacy of the Republic of Korea, it evidently evokes the [Korean] race first and the [South Korean] state second."

Desecration
The South Korean flag is considered by a large part of the country's citizens to represent the "Korean race" rather than solely the South Korean state; consequently flag desecration by the country's citizens is rare when compared to other countries, where citizens may desecrate their own national flags as political statements. Thus those South Korean citizens opposed to the state's actions or even its existence will still treat their national flag with reverence and respect: "There is therefore none of the parodying or deliberate desecration of the state flag that one encounters in the countercultures of other countries."

Regardless of frequency, the South Korean Criminal Act punishes desecration of the South Korean national flag in various ways:

Article 105 imposes up to 5 years in prison, disfranchisement of up to 10 years, or a fine up to 7 million South Korean won for damaging, removing, or staining a South Korean flag or emblem with intent to insult the South Korean state. Article 5 makes this crime punishable, even if done by aliens outside South Korea.
Article 106 imposes up to 1 years in prison, disfranchisement of up to 5 years, or a fine up to 2 million South Korean won for defaming a South Korean flag or emblem with intent to insult the South Korean state. Article 5 makes this crime punishable, even if done by aliens outside South Korea.

South Korea also criminalizes not just desecration of the South Korean flag, but the flags of other countries as well:

Article 109 imposes up to 2 years in prison or a fine up to 3 million South Korean won for damaging, removing, or staining a foreign flag or emblem with intent to insult a foreign country. Article 110 forbids prosecution without foreign governmental complaint.

Specifications

Dimensions

The width and height are in the ratio of 3 to 2. There are five sections on the flag, the taegeuk and the four groups of bars. The diameter of the circle is half of the height. The top of the taegeuk should be red and the bottom of the taegeuk should be blue. The groups of bars are put in the four corners of the flag.

Colors

The Taegukgi's colors are specified in the "Ordinance Act of the Law concerning the National Flag of the Republic of Korea." The color scheme was unspecified until 1997, when the South Korean government decided to standardize specifications for the flag. In October 1997, a Presidential ordinance on the standard specification of the South Korean flag was promulgated, and that specification was acceded by the National Flag Law in July 2007.

Colors are defined in legislation by the Munsell and CIE color systems as follows:

Gallery

See also

List of Korean flags
List of South Korean flags
Korean Unification Flag
Flag of North Korea
Pledge of allegiance to the flag of South Korea

References

External links

Flags introduced in 1948
Flags introduced in 2011
Korea, South
National symbols of South Korea
National flags
Flags of South Korea